Robert Philson (c. 1759 – July 25, 1831) was an Irish-American soldier and politician.

Philson was born in County Donegal, Ulster, Ireland, and immigrated to Pennsylvania with his uncle John Fletcher. They kept a store in Berlin, Somerset County, Pennsylvania.

In 1794, Philson was arrested for his involvement in the Whiskey Rebellion. He was sent to Philadelphia for trial, but he and his co-defendant, Herman Husband, were acquitted.

Philson served as associate judge of Somerset County, Pennsylvania, for twenty years, and also served as a one-term congressman during the 16th United States Congress.

Philson was commissioned a brigadier general of the Second Brigade, Tenth Division, Pennsylvania militia on May 9, 1800, a position he held during the War of 1812.

Further reading

The Political Graveyard

References

1759 births
1831 deaths
American militia generals
American militiamen in the War of 1812
Kingdom of Ireland emigrants to the Thirteen Colonies
Pennsylvania state court judges
People of the Whiskey Rebellion
Democratic-Republican Party members of the United States House of Representatives from Pennsylvania